Trafficking protein particle complex subunit 4 is a protein that in humans is encoded by the TRAPPC4 gene.

References

Further reading